The 1946 West Chester Golden Rams football team was an American football team that represented West Chester State Teachers College (later renamed West Chester University of Pennsylvania) as an independent during the 1946 college football season. In their 10th year under head coach Glenn Killinger, the Golden Ramss compiled a 9–1 record and outscored opponents by a total of 187 to 33.

At a time when college football was not fully integrated, the West Chester team featured Johnny Eaton, an African-American back from Abington, Pennsylvania.

Schedule

References

West Cheste
West Chester Golden Rams football seasons
West Chester Golden Rams football